O'Loan is a surname. Notable people with the surname include:

Declan O'Loan (born 1951), Northern Irish politician
Nuala O'Loan (born 1951), noted public figure in Northern Ireland
Rod O'Loan (1915–1992), Australian rugby league footballer